Yorkshire Water Authority (Southern) F.C. was an English football club based in Sheffield, South Yorkshire.

History
The club, formed as Sheffield Waterworks, joined the Yorkshire Football League in 1970, and spent eleven seasons in the competition - all of them in the bottom Third Division. For their last season they were renamed Yorkshire Water Authority (Southern). They saved their best league finish for their last season, when finishing 3rd.

League and cup history

References

Defunct football clubs in South Yorkshire
Defunct football clubs in England
Hatchard League
Yorkshire Football League
Works association football teams in England